Coady Willis is an American drummer and a member of Big Business, High on Fire, White Shit, and the Melvins. He previously played in the bands Dead Low Tide, Broadcast Oblivion, and The Murder City Devils.

Willis and Big Business bandmate Jared Warren both appear on the Melvins' albums (A) Senile Animal, Nude with Boots and The Bride Screamed Murder and have officially been members of the band since moving to Los Angeles in January 2006.

He also sometimes plays drums in the live incarnation of Dale Crover's side project Altamont (also his bandmate and fellow drummer in The Melvins).

Select discography

The Murder City Devils
1997: The Murder City Devils
1998: Empty Bottles, Broken Hearts
2000: In Name and Blood
2001: Thelema (EP)
2014: The White Ghost Has Blood on Its Hands Again

Big Business
2005: Head for the Shallow
2007: Here Come the Waterworks
2009: Mind the Drift
2011: Quadruple Single (EP)
2013: Battlefields Forever
2016: Command Your Weather
2019: The Beast You Are

Melvins
2006: (A) Senile Animal
2008: Nude with Boots
2010: The Bride Screamed Murder
2011: Sugar Daddy Live (live album)
2012: The Bulls & the Bees (EP)
2013: Everybody Loves Sausages (select songs)
2016: Basses Loaded (on the song "Choco Plumbing")

References

American drummers
Living people
Horror punk musicians
The Murder City Devils members
Melvins members
Year of birth missing (living people)